The Phantom is a 2021 American documentary written and directed by Patrick Forbes. It follows Carlos DeLuna, who was arrested in 1983 for the murder of a woman, and protested his innocence until he was executed, stating another Carlos had committed the crime. Doug Liman serves as an executive producer.

Synopsis
It follows Carlos DeLuna, who was arrested in 1983 for the murder of a woman, and protested his innocence he was executed, stating another had committed the crime.

Release
The film had its world premiere at the Tribeca Film Festival on June 14, 2021. Prior to, Greenwich Entertainment acquired distribution rights to the film, and set it for a July 2, 2021, release.

References

External links
 

2021 films
2021 documentary films
American documentary films
Films about murder
Documentary films about death
Documentary films about capital punishment
Documentary films about crime in the United States
2020s English-language films
2020s American films